FK Petrovec is a football club based in the village of Petrovec near Skopje, North Macedonia. They are currently competing in the Macedonian Third League (North Division).

External links
FK Petrovec Facebook 
Club info at MacedonianFootball 
Football Federation of Macedonia 

Petrovec
Petrovec Municipality
Association football clubs established in 1998
1998 establishments in the Republic of Macedonia